Pasang Dorjee Sona (born 6 November 1972) is an Indian politician from the state of Arunachal Pradesh. He represents 33rd Mechukha Assembly constituency.

Sona was elected for 3rd consecutive time as MLA from 33rd Mechukha Assembly Constituency in 2019 from Bharatiya Janata Party (BJP) ticket. Today he is a member of the Bhartiya Janata Party. He has a law degree, is an LLB graduate.

In June 2019, Sona was elected as Speaker of the Arunachal Pradesh Legislative Assembly.

See also
Arunachal Pradesh Legislative Assembly

References

External links
 Pasang Dorjee Sona profile
 MyNeta Profile
 Janpratinidhi Profile

Living people
Bharatiya Janata Party politicians from Arunachal Pradesh
Arunachal Pradesh MLAs 2014–2019
Indian National Congress politicians from Arunachal Pradesh
People's Party of Arunachal politicians
Speakers of the Arunachal Pradesh Legislative Assembly
1972 births
Arunachal Pradesh MLAs 2009–2014
Arunachal Pradesh MLAs 2019–2024